Sir Edward Ernest Cooper, 1st Baronet (1848 – 12 February 1922) was Lord Mayor of London for 1919 to 1920.

See also
Cooper baronets

References
https://www.ukwhoswho.com/view/10.1093/ww/9780199540891.001.0001/ww-9780199540884-e-194973

Knights Bachelor
1848 births
1922 deaths
Baronets in the Baronetage of the United Kingdom
20th-century lord mayors of London
Sheriffs of the City of London